Venezuela is a predominantly Christian country, with Islam being a minority religion. There are approximately 100,000 Muslims in Venezuela which make up 0.4 percent of the nation's population. Venezuela has a small but influential Muslim population. Many of them are Arabs of Lebanese, Palestinian, Syrian and Turkish descent.

The capital city Caracas has a Muslim population of 15,000. The Mosque of Sheikh Ibrahim Al-Ibrahim in Caracas is the second largest mosque in Latin America. Located in a rapidly changing area of the city, this historic mosque features a dome, minaret and portal to signal its presence in the urban landscape, and devices such as the octagonal hall rising up from a platform to a circular dome to achieve the transition between the street and the interior of the prayer hall. It was constructed with funds from the Ibrahim bin Abdul Aziz Al-Ibrahim Foundation under the planning of architect Oscar Bracho. Other notable mosques and Islamic organisations include the Isla Margarita-Caribe La Comunidad Islámica Venezolana, Centro Islámico de Venezuela, the Mezquita al-Rauda in Maracaibo, the Asociación Honorable Mezquita de Jerusalén in Valencia, Centro Islámico de Maiquetía in Vargas, and the Asociación Benéfica Islámica in Bolívar. There is also a mosque in Punto Fijo built in 2008.

Margarita Island in particular is home to a sizeable Arab Muslim community. The local cable television outlets telecast channels like al-Jazeera; LBC Sat, a Lebanese channel; and more recently, MBC and ART, two Saudi Arabian channels. Women wearing hijab generally work as till operators. On most shop counters, Quranic verses are on display. Muslims here are mainly involved  in retail businesses as well as banks and travel agencies.

On 11 February 2006, around 200 (mainly Muslim) protesters marched to the Danish embassy in Caracas, and burnt Danish and U.S. flags as protests over cartoons of Muhammad spread to Latin America.

On 20 July 2006, dozens of people marched in Caracas towards the Israeli embassy to protest against the war in Lebanon. Most of them were Venezuelan Muslims, but some were members of pro-government organisations.

References

External links
Mezquita Sheikh Ibrahim website on MiPunto.com 

 
Ven